Ringstindane  is a mountain ridge consisting of three peaks south-west in Jotunheimen National Park in Vestland, Norway. The highest peak reaches 2,124 m (6,969 ft) above sea level.

References 

Mountains of Vestland